The Canton of Thizy-les-Bourgs is a French administrative division, located in the Rhône department.

The canton was established by decree of 27 February 2014 which came into force in March 2015.

Composition 
The canton of Thizy-les-Bourgs is composed of 21 communes:

See also
Cantons of the Rhône department
Communes of the Rhône department

References

Cantons of Rhône (department)